Papyrus 119 (in the Gregory-Aland numbering), designated by 𝔓119, is an early copy of a small part of the New Testament in Greek found among the Oxyrhynchus Papyri. It is a manuscript of the Gospel of John.

Surviving texts

The surviving texts of John are verses 1:21-28,38-44. They are in a fragmentary condition.

Assignation
The manuscript paleographically has been assigned to the early 3rd century (INTF).

Characteristics

The text is written with one column per page, and 16 lines per page. 40 lines have been reconstructed.

 Location 
The manuscript is currently housed at the Papyrology Rooms of the Ashmolean Museum at Oxford with the shelf number P. Oxy. 4803.

See also 

 List of New Testament papyri
 Oxyrhynchus Papyri

References

Further reading 

 R. Hatzilambrou, P. J. Parsons, J. Chapa, The Oxyrhynchus Papyri LXXI (London: 2007), pp. 2–6.

External links

Images 
 P. Oxy. LXIV 4803 from Papyrology at Oxford's "POxy: Oxyrhynchus Online"

Official registration 
 "Continuation of the Manuscript List" Institute for New Testament Textual Research, University of Münster. Retrieved April 9, 2008 
 Bible Papyrus p119 at the Literal Translation of the Original Greek New Testament

New Testament papyri
3rd-century biblical manuscripts
Early Greek manuscripts of the New Testament
Gospel of John papyri